Leslie H. Davis (July 31, 1900 – February 26, 1966) was an American football coach.  He was the head football coach at Morningside College  in Sioux City, Iowa.  He held that position for the 1946 and 1947 seasons.  His coaching record at Morningside was 7–9–1.

Head coaching record

References

1900 births
1966 deaths
Morningside Mustangs football coaches
Place of birth missing
Place of death missing